Yvonne Louise Georgette Loriod-Messiaen (20 January 1924 – 17 May 2010) was a French pianist, teacher, and composer, and the second wife of composer Olivier Messiaen.  Her sister was the Ondes Martenot player Jeanne Loriod.

Biography
Loriod was born in Houilles, Yvelines to Gaston and Simone Loriod. Initially receiving piano lessons from her godmother, she later studied at the Paris Conservatoire and became one of Olivier Messiaen's most avid pupils.  She also studied with Isidor Philipp, Lazare Lévy then Marcel Ciampi.  She went on to become a nationally acclaimed recording artist and concert pianist and premiered most of Messiaen's works for the piano, starting in the 1940s. Messiaen said that he was able to indulge in "the greatest eccentricities" when writing for piano, knowing that they would be mastered by Loriod. Both she and her sister Jeanne often performed as the soloists in his Turangalîla-Symphonie. Loriod also orchestrated part of Messiaen's final orchestral work, Concert à quatre.

Loriod gave the French premiere of Béla Bartók's Piano Concerto No. 2 in 1945, having learnt it in only eight days.

In 1961, Loriod married Olivier Messiaen following the death of his long institutionalized first wife, Claire Delbos. She is generally considered to be the most important interpreter of Messiaen's piano works.  In her later years, she and Messiaen acted as mentors to the pianist Pierre-Laurent Aimard, who has since become a great champion of the works of Messiaen.

Olivier Messiaen died in April 1992 in Saint-Denis. She survived him by 18 years, dying on 17 May 2010 in Saint-Denis, Paris, aged 86. She was survived by her other sister, Jacqueline Loriod, and stepson Pascal Messiaen.

Compositions
 Pièce sur la souffrance, for orchestra
 Mélopées africaines, for Ondes Martenot, piano and flute (1945)
 Grains de cendre, for soprano and chamber orchestra (1946)

Publications
 Messiaen, Olivier. Traité de rythme, de couleur, et d’ornithologie (1949–1992) ("Treatise on rhythm, colour and ornithology"), completed by Yvonne Loriod. 7 parts bound in 8 volumes. Paris: Leduc, 1994–2002.
 Messiaen, Olivier. Analyses of the Piano Works of Maurice Ravel, edited by Yvonne Loriod, translated by Paul Griffiths. [Paris]: Durand, 2005.

Selected recordings
 Olivier Messiaen: Vingt Regards sur l'enfant-Jésus
Label: Erato, 4509-91705-2
3 August 1993

 Olivier Messiaen: Turangalîla Symphonie
Label: Deutsche Grammophon, 31781
12 May 1992

References

External links 
[ Discography] at www.allmusic.com
Yvonne Loriod-Messiaen profile and discography at www.oliviermessiaen.org
Daily Telegraph: Obituary
The Guardian: Obituary
"Yvonne Loriod, Pianist and Messiaen Muse, Dies at 86" in The New York Times 18 May 2010

1924 births
2010 deaths
Conservatoire de Paris alumni
Contemporary classical music performers
20th-century French women classical pianists
French composers
People from Houilles
Academic staff of the Conservatoire de Paris
Piano pedagogues
Pupils of Darius Milhaud
Pupils of Isidor Philipp